Eburia cinerea is a species of beetle in the family Cerambycidae that is endemic to Peru.

References

cinerea
Beetles described in 1959
Endemic fauna of Peru
Beetles of South America